Matt Norris (born December 3, 1988) is an American politician serving in the Minnesota House of Representatives since 2023. A member of the Minnesota Democratic-Farmer-Labor Party (DFL), Norris represents District 32B in the northern Twin Cities metropolitan area, which includes the cities of Blaine and Lexington in Anoka County, Minnesota.

Early life, education and career 
Norris received his bachelor's degree in marketing from the University of Minnesota and his Juris Doctor degree from the University of Minnesota Law School.

Norris interned for U.S. Senator Amy Klobuchar in 2009, and worked as a law clerk for the U.S. Senate Judiciary Committee in 2012. From 2010 to 2017, Norris worked as the youth planner for the city of Brooklyn Park, Minnesota.

Minnesota House of Representatives 
Norris was first elected to the Minnesota House of Representatives in 2022, defeating Republican incumbent Donald Raleigh. Norris serves as vice-chair of the Taxes Committee, and sits on the Transportation Finance and Policy, Veterans and Military Affairs Finance and Policy, and Housing Finance and Policy Committees.

Electoral history

Personal life 
Norris lives in Blaine, Minnesota.

References

External links 

Living people
1988 births
21st-century American politicians
Democratic Party members of the Minnesota House of Representatives
University of Minnesota alumni
University of Minnesota Law School alumni
People from Blaine, Minnesota